Tara Road is a 2005 film directed by Gillies MacKinnon. It is based on the 1998 novel of the same name by Maeve Binchy.

Plot
Without ever having met and 5,000 kilometers apart, Marilyn Vine and Ria Lynch, trade houses. They're both looking for an escape from their grieving and marital crises. By running away, both come to discover  about themselves and to face their problems at home.

Living in suburban Connecticut, upper middle class Marilyn and her college professor husband Greg Vine are grieving over their fifteen year old son Dale’s recent death in a tragic motorcycle accident. Unable to cope, Marilyn views her marriage as collateral damage.

Dublin residing Ria learns from her property manager husband Danny Lynch that not only does he not want to have another child with her as she does, but that he has fallen in love with another woman who is pregnant with his child.

Rather than a planned Hawaiian getaway with Greg, Marilyn tries to contact Danny, who Greg had met long ago at a business function. She wants to arrange a two month house swap with someone in Dublin, as she feels she needs to go somewhere to be alone. She actually contacts Ria, who also needs to get away from her own situation. So, she agrees to the house swap on the spot, whose two children, teenage Annie and adolescent Brian, will stay with Danny for the first month before joining her in Connecticut.

Complete opposites, reserved Marilyn keeps Dale’s death from everyone in Ireland, including Ria and Ria feels the need to tell everyone in the States about Danny leaving her. Neither Marilyn or Ria know what to expect in their new surroundings.

There are unofficial welcoming committees on each side of the Atlantic, composed of Marilyn and Ria's closest friends. Both Marilyn and Ria make a special connection with someone in the other's life. Marilyn finds solace in Ria's garden and becomes friends with restaurateur Colm Maguire, who is tending to Ria's garden in her absence, and Ria gets a job cooking, and has a date or two with Greg’s brother Andy. Beyond these connections, each of Marilyn and Ria's lives at home continue without them.

Meanwhile, Ria's husband Danny’s economic and personal problems seem to bring ruin to those close to him. Thanks to Marilyn working with his mother, they find a way to save the house on Tara Road.

The two women’s new experiences help them view their life changes slightly differently than before and they are able to move ahead as stronger people.

Cast 
 Olivia Williams as Ria Lynch
 Andie MacDowell as Marilyn Vine
 Iain Glen as Danny Lynch, Ria's husband, who works at a property management company
 August Zirner as Greg Vine, Marilyn's English professor husband
 Stephen Rea as Colm Maguire, Ria's restaurateur friend
 Maria Doyle Kennedy as Rosemary Ryan, Ria's best friend
 Sarah Bolger as Annie Lynch, Ria's daughter, the older of her two offspring
 Johnny Brennan as Brian Lynch, Ria's son, the younger of her two offspring
 Eileen Colgan as Nora, Ria's mother
 Jean-Marc Barr as Andy Vine, Greg's Los Angeles residing brother
 Alan Devlin as Barney McCarthy, Danny's boss
 Brenda Fricker as Mona McCarthy, Barney's wife
 Ruby Wax as Carlotta, a flamboyant person who is one of Marilyn and Greg's neighbors
 Jia Francis as Heidi Franks, one of Marilyn and Greg's neighbors
Heike Makatsch as Bernadette
 Maeve Binchy (cameo) as a restaurant patron

Production 
Tara Road is the fourth Maeve Binchy novel to be adapted for film or television. Binchy said she once swapped her house in London to stay in Sydney, Australia, but that the story was not autobiographical "because nothing would be duller than reading about two happily married, settled couples, which is what we and they were", although the trip did inspire the story. She praised the writers for condensing her 600 page novel into a 109-page script.
The filmmakers asked Binchy which location in Dublin she had been thinking of for Tara Road and she told them but the real location proved impractical and they instead found a different location like the one she had in mind.

Filming took place in Cape Town, South Africa, for three weeks for the scenes set in Connecticut.

Kenilworth Square area of Rathgar, Dublin, was the location of titular Tara Road. Caviston's deli and restaurant in Glasthule, Dublin, was used for filming.

The film premiered at the Savoy Cinema, Dublin, on September 29, 2005.

Reception 

Michael Dwyer of The Irish Times called it a "sketchy, conventional melodrama" and said the film "has the distinct whiff of a movie made for export, and it lacks the realistic grounding of the only earlier Binchy film, Circle of Friends (1995)." Dwyer was critical of the adaptation from the book, as the editing had left "gaps in the narrative and characterisation."
Padraic McKiernan of the Irish Independent was positive about MacDowell's star quality, but found the ending farcical.

In 2007, producer Noel Pearson called the film a disappointment, saying: "There was no chemistry there, and you could see that on the screen. It was one of those things that just disintegrated from day one. You never know what's going to happen."

It topped the Irish box office on the week of its release taking over €200,000, with a worldwide total of over $875,000, mostly from the UK.

Home media

The film was released on DVD October 9, 2007.

See also 
 The Holiday

References

External links 
 

2005 films
Irish drama films
2005 drama films
Films based on Irish novels
Films directed by Gillies MacKinnon
Films set in Connecticut
2000s English-language films